Choi Han-bit is a South Korean model, actress and singer. She is a member of the South-Korean girl group Mercury. She is a graduate of the School of Dance at the Korean National University of Arts in Seoul, where she majored in Korean traditional dance. With the support of her parents, Choi underwent male-to-female sex reassignment surgery in 2006. She changed her given name to Han-bit, and is legally recognized as female in South Korea. In an interview, Choi said that "living with the female body itself brought me the greatest feeling of euphoria", but also that she has "a fond memory of the past before the operation". Prior to her surgery, she had appeared on the Seoul Broadcasting System (SBS) television show Yoo Jae-suk's Jinsil Game in 2005.  She was a contestant on Korea's Next Top Model, Cycle 3, where she ended 10th.

Career
After transitioning, Choi began to pursue her lifelong ambition of becoming a model. In 2009, she was amongst more than 1,200 applicants to the annual SBS-sponsored Super Model Contest, and gained public attention by progressing through the contest's preliminary rounds. Choi's participation drew mixed reactions from internet users and other contestants, but SBS officials stated that they would view it as a "violation of human rights" to disqualify a transgender individual whose legal sex was female. As one of the contest's 32 finalists, Choi automatically qualified as a professional model. Despite this, Choi claims to have faced discrimination in the modelling industry, having been refused participation in a fashion show without any clear reason. Since taking part in Super Model Contest, Choi has appeared on a number of television shows and has expressed a desire to become an actress. She has said that she hopes to marry around the age of thirty, and will adopt two children.

Filmography
 A Perfect Woman (2010-03-08 ~ 2010-04-26) - Herself
 The Princess' Man (2011-07-20 ~ 2011-10-06) - Mu-yeong
 Getting Aunt Gogong-sil (2011)
 Korea's Next Top Model, Cycle 3 (2012) - Herself (contestant)

Notes

References

External links 
 
 Choi Han-bit's Blog
 
 
 Choi Han-bit - Daum Cafe
 Stershop - Daum Cafe

1987 births
Living people
People from Gangneung
21st-century South Korean actresses
21st-century South Korean women singers
21st-century South Korean LGBT people
South Korean LGBT actors
South Korean LGBT singers
South Korean transgender people
South Korean female models
South Korean film actresses
South Korean television actresses
Top Model contestants
Transgender female models
Transgender actresses
Transgender singers